List of administrative division codes of the PRC in Division 7 and 8 or Taiwan Province (PRC), Hong Kong, and Macau.

Taiwan (71)
While the administrative division code for Taiwan Province is 710000, Ministry of Public Security of People's Republic of China allocates 830000 as the administrative division code.

Hong Kong (81)

Macau (82)

References 

China geography-related lists